Dřínov is the name of several locations in the Czech Republic:

 Dřínov (Kladno District), a village in the Central Bohemian Region
 Dřínov (Kroměříž District), a village in the Zlín Region
 Dřínov (Mělník District), a village in the Central Bohemian Region